Sasaram Lok Sabha constituency is one of the 40 Lok Sabha (parliamentary) constituencies in Bihar state in eastern India. It is reserved for Scheduled Castes.

Vidhan Sabha segments
As of May 2019, Sasaram Lok Sabha constituency comprises the following six Vidhan Sabha (legislative assembly) segments:

Note:M.L.A of Constituency No.206 Chainpur won as a candidate of BSP but later joined JD(U).

Members of Lok Sabha
The following is the list of the Members of Parliament elected from this Lok Sabha constituency:

1952-1957
As Shahabad South Lok Sabha constituency

1957-Present
As Sasaram Lok Sabha constituency. Sasaram had 2 Member of Parliament from in the 1st and 2nd Lok Sabha (1952-1962).

Election results

2019 Election

2014 Election

1977 Election
 Jagivan Ram (Cong for Democracy, w Janata Party support) : 327,995 votes
 Mungeri Lall (INC) : 84,185

1952 Election
 Two-candidates seat, named Shahabad South
 Ram Subhag Singh (INC) : 114,988 votes.  Lok Sabha Member #1 
 Radha Mohan Singh (SP) : 74,074
 AND
 Jagjiwan Ram (INC) : 111,524 votes.  Lok Sabha Member #2  
 Chhattu Dusadh (SP) : 62,697

See also
 Rohtas district, in Bihar 
 List of Constituencies of the Lok Sabha

References

External links
Sasaram lok sabha  constituency election 2019 result details

Lok Sabha constituencies in Bihar
Politics of Rohtas district
Politics of Kaimur district